Magruder Mountain is a summit in the U.S. state of Idaho.

Magruder Mountain was named after Lloyd Magruder, a pioneer who was killed in a robbery in 1863.

References

Mountains of Idaho County, Idaho
Mountains of Idaho